The fusilier damselfish (Lepidozygus tapeinosoma) is a species of damselfish in the family Pomacentridae. It found in the Indo-Pacific. They are found in the aquarium hobby. It is the only species in the monotypic genus, Lepidozygus which sits in its own subfamily, the Lepidozyginae.

Distribution and habitat
They are found in the Indo-Pacific. Populations in the Indian Ocean are found in eastern Africa, the Gulf of Aden, Oman, India, the Maldives, Sri Lanka, the Similan Islands in the Andaman Sea, Indonesia, and Australia. In the Pacific Ocean, they are found in Cambodia, Indonesia, the Philippines, the Great Barrier Reef in Australia, Vietnam, Taiwan, various Pacific islands throughout to Hawaii, the Gulf of California south to northern Peru. This fish is found in coral reefs and lagoons. They live in tropical waters.

Description
They have 12 dorsal spines, 14 to 15 dorsal soft rays, 2 anal spines, and 15 to 16 anal soft rays on their fins. Coloration of this fish can change a lot. It depends on its behavior. When it feeds, it turns silvery green. It darkens when resting. In the Maldives, adults guarding their eggs have a banded pattern.

Ecology

Diet
This fish feeds on zooplankton.

Behavior
This fish changes its color depending on what it is doing. They form aggregations.

In the aquarium
This fish is occasionally found in the aquarium trade. They can be kept in groups, and They are very peaceful. Behavior is similar to Anthias, but they are not as delicate. The Fussiler damselfish will flash red and green colors when feeding. Unlike many other shoaling fish, the fusilier damsels will not single out and focus aggression on the weakest individual. The fussiler damselfish is a social animal and does best when kept with others of the same species. A fast swimming fish that will readily eat most any foods offered.

References

External links
 

Pomacentridae
Taxa named by Pieter Bleeker
Fish described in 1856